Silje Ekroll Jahren (born 10 May 1988) is a Norwegian orienteering competitor and junior world champion.

Sports career
Jahren won a gold medal in the relay at the 2007 Junior World Orienteering Championships in Dubbo, Australia, together with Kine Hallan Steiwer and Siri Ulvestad, in a close race with the Swedish team.

She received a silver medal in sprint at the 2008 Junior World Orienteering Championships in Gothenburg, Sweden, finishing less than two seconds behind winner Emma Klingenberg.

She competed at the 2012 World Orienteering Championships. In the sprint competition she qualified for the final, where he placed 10th.

Her mother club is Raumar (Ullensaker), but she now represents Sävedalen AIK.

She has also competed in cross-country skiing, for Ullensaker SK.

In the last world cup of 2019, held in China at the end of October, she ranked 68.

References

External links

1988 births
Living people
People from Ullensaker
Norwegian orienteers
Female orienteers
Foot orienteers
World Orienteering Championships medalists
Sportspeople from Viken (county)
Junior World Orienteering Championships medalists